Ömeranlı (formerly Tavşançalı) is a rural neighborhood (mahalle) in the District of Kulu, Konya Province, Turkey. The town had a population of 4,567 in 2020 and is one of the largest villages in Turkey.

Population 
The town is populated by ethnic Kurds of the Reşwan tribe. Many people left the village in the 1990s for Scandinavian countries.

Born 
Fahrettin Koca (1965), Turkish physician and politician

References 

Populated places in Konya Province